Frances Ruth Tophill is a British horticulturist, author, and television presenter known for her contributions to Love Your Garden and Gardeners' World. She has written five books.

Early life
Tophill was born in Deal, Kent, and is one of three sisters. She studied for a bachelor's degree in horticulture with plantsmanship from the Scottish Agricultural College and Royal Botanic Garden Edinburgh which she completed in 2013.

Career
Tophill featured on ITV's Love Your Garden alongside Alan Titchmarsh, David Domoney, and Katie Rushworth, and in 2016 became a presenter on the BBC's Gardeners' World.

In June 2022, her first show-garden won a platinum medal and best in show at Gardeners' World Live at the NEC in Birmingham.

Her book, The Modern Gardener: A practical guide for creating a beautiful and creative garden (Octopus Publishing, 2022) has been described as containing a "passionate, environmental debate" about gardening and gardeners.

Tophill works with the Royal Horticultural Society's Campaign for School Gardening to promote gardening to young people and is a keen quilter and amateur potter.

Selected publications
 The First-Time Gardener. Kyle Books, 2015. 
 The Container Gardener. Kyle Books, 2017. 
 Container Gardener's Handbook. Companion House Books, 2018. 
 Rewild Your Garden: Create a haven for birds, bees, and butterflies. Quercus Books, 2020. 
 The Modern Gardener: A practical guide for creating a beautiful and creative garden. Octopus Publishing, 2022.

References

External links
https://www.gardenersunearthed.com/2020/01/frances-tophill.html

Living people
Year of birth missing (living people)
English gardeners
English television presenters
Women horticulturists and gardeners
Television personalities from Kent
Alumni of Scotland's Rural College
People from Deal, Kent
British women television presenters
Women non-fiction writers